Jonathan Groff (born May 17, 1962) is an American actor, comedian, director, producer, and screenwriter. He is best known for his role as Jerome Sinfeld in the Netflix series blackAF, and as an  executive producer of the ABC sitcom black-ish (2014–present).  

Groff graduated from Brown University in 1983 with a Bachelor of Arts in history, initially pursuing a career in stand-up comedy before transitioning to television writing. He wrote for The Jon Stewart Show and Short Attention Span Theater, hosted by Stewart and, later, Marc Maron. Groff was the head writer at Late Night with Conan O'Brien in the late 1990s. After leaving Late Night, Groff developed Father of the Pride with Jeffrey Katzenberg. Subsequently, he  was the showrunner for Andy Barker, P.I., co-created with O'Brien. More recently he has worked on Black-ish and as co-showrunner on Happy Endings.

Filmography

Writer

Producer

Actor

Creator

Director

References

American male comedians
Jeopardy! contestants
Living people
Year of birth missing (living people)